The Tahitian Choir is a choral group from the island known as Rapa Iti, one of the Bass Islands in the South Pacific, approximately 1,000 miles southeast of Tahiti.  The choir is made up of 126 men and women.  Their music portrays their traditional Tahitian life and dialect and has been recorded on two albums and one re-release, recordings produced by Ethnomusicologist Pascal Nabet Meyer.

Discography
Rapa Iti (1992), Triloka Records
Rapa Iti, Vol. 2 (1994), Shanachie
Rapa Iti (2004), Soulitude Records re-release with bonus track, enhanced

External links
NPR's Website, All Things Considered

French Polynesian musicians
Tahitian music